The Dennis Trident 2 is a 2-axle low-floor double-decker bus chassis originally manufactured by Dennis, which was unveiled in 1997 and replaced the Dennis Arrow. It was built by TransBus after Dennis was incorporated into the group in 2001, then from 2004, it was built by Alexander Dennis following the collapse of TransBus.

Design 
The Trident 2 chassis features a transversely mounted engine on the right side, with the radiator mounted on the left side of the engine compartment. It could be fitted with C-series Euro II engine (later Cummins ISCe Euro III engine), coupled to Voith DIWA or ZF Ecomat gearbox. It was available with Alexander ALX400, Plaxton President and East Lancs Lolyne/Myllennium Lolyne bodywork.

Orders 
In the first few years of production, the Trident 2 was popular with a large number sold to large bus operators such as Stagecoach, FirstGroup, Travel West Midlands and Lothian Buses. A total of 2,255 Dennis Tridents would be built for London bus operators, 998 of these built for Stagecoach London with Alexander ALX400 bodywork, and another 425 being built for First London. Some Tridents were exported to Ireland (for Dublin Bus) and Spain (for sightseeing operations in Barcelona and Madrid). But later, due to increased competition after the launch of the Scania OmniDekka and TransBus being put into administration, the sales of Trident 2 dropped significantly, leaving Stagecoach as its major buyer.

Rebrand to Enviro400 chassis 

In 2005, Alexander Dennis developed the new version of Trident 2 chassis for its Enviro400 double-decker. Marketed as the Enviro400 chassis, the name "Trident 2" continued to appear on the manufacturer's plate and it retained the Cummins ISCe Euro III engine (soon replaced by Cummins ISBe 6-cylinder Euro IV) and Voith/ZF gearbox, it also received a number of modifications such as a longer front overhang, with a different shape of fuel tank became available. Production of the older version of Trident 2 chassis continued until 2006, with the newest example being delivered to Isle of Man Transport.

The new version of Trident 2 chassis was also available with Darwen/Optare Olympus bodywork, the first example was delivered to CT Plus of London in 2008.

In 2008, Alexander Dennis unveiled the hybrid-electric powered version of Trident 2 (the Enviro400H) using BAE Systems's HybriDrive series drive system with Cummins ISBe 4-cylinder engine fitted for power generation. Also in the same year, Alexander Dennis unveiled the further developed version of Trident 2 for the "New Generation" Enviro400, with the engine being moved to the left side and the radiator being moved to the right side of the engine compartment. It could be fitted with Cummins ISBe Euro V/EEV or MAN D0836LOH engine, coupled to Voith DIWA or ZF EcoLife gearbox. In 2009, Alexander Dennis developed the Hong Kong version of the Trident 2 (Enviro400). Based on the further developed version unveiled in 2008, it has a longer rear overhang and could be fitted with Cummins ISLe Euro V engine.

Preservation

In 2014, Stagecoach donated the first London Trident (TA1) to the London Bus Museum, Brooklands while another (TAS524) was donated to the Glasgow Vintage Vehicle Trust. In September 2019, TA1 was subsequently sold in to preservation to the Bromley Bus Preservation Group, along with the last Trident in service in London.

In November 2019, Stagecoach North West donated a Transbus Trident to the Ribble Vehicle Preservation Trust, making it the charity's first low-floor bus.

In 2021, Stagecoach Manchester donated their first Dennis Trident, which was the first low-floor Stagecoach bus outside of London, to the Museum of Transport in Greater Manchester.

Gallery

References

External links

Product description Alexander Dennis
Product description of Enviro400 hybrid BAE Systems

Trident 2
Double-decker buses
Low-floor buses
Open-top buses
Vehicles introduced in 1997
Bus chassis